The 1971–72 CHL season was the ninth season of the Central Hockey League, a North American minor professional league. Six teams participated in the regular season, and the Dallas Black Hawks won the league title.

Regular season

Playoffs

External links
 Statistics on hockeydb.com

CPHL
Central Professional Hockey League seasons